Michela Taufer (born 23 April 1971) is an Italian-American computer scientist and holds the Jack Dongarra Professorship in  High Performance Computing within the Department of Electrical Engineering and Computer Science at the University of Tennessee, Knoxville.  She is an ACM Distinguished Scientist and an  IEEE Senior Member. In 2021, together with a team al Lawrence Livermore National Laboratory, she earned a R&D 100 Award for the Flux workload management software framework in the Software/Services category.

Education
Taufer attended the University of Padua where she obtained a Laurea in Computer Engineering in 1996. She later went on to earn her Ph.D. in computer science at  ETH Zurich (Swiss Federal Institute of Technology in Zürich) in 2002. The dissertation for her Ph.D. in computer science from ETH Zurich (Swiss Federal Institute of Technology in Zürich) was titled, Inverting Middleware: Performance Analysis of Layered Application Codes in High Performance Distributed Computing, and was supervised by Thomas M. Stricker and  Daniel A. Reed.

Research
She applies advances in computational and algorithmic solutions for high-performance computing technologies (i.e., volunteer computing, accelerators and GPUs, and in situ analytics workflows)  to multi-disciplinary fields including molecular dynamics, ecoinformatics, seismology, and biology.

References 	

American computer scientists
American expatriates in Switzerland
Fellow Members of the IEEE
Women computer scientists
ETH Zurich alumni
University of Padua alumni
Italian computer scientists
University of Tennessee faculty
Italian emigrants to the United States
Italian expatriates in Switzerland
University of Delaware faculty
Place of birth missing (living people)
1971 births
Living people